Ein Mahil is an Arab local council in the Northern District of Israel, located about five kilometers north-east of Nazareth. It was declared a local council in 1964.

History

Ottoman Empire 
In 1596, Ein Mahil appeared in Ottoman tax registers as being in the Nahiya of Tabariyya, part of Safad Sanjak.  It had a population of 28 Muslim households.  They paid a fixed tax rate of 20% on agricultural products, which included  wheat, barley, fruit trees, and goats or beehives; a total of 1,355 akçe.  A map by Pierre Jacotin, from 1799 showed the place named Ain el Mahel.

In 1838 it was noted as a Muslim village in the Nazareth district.

The French explorer Victor Guérin  passed by  the village in the 1875, and described it as having 10 poor dwellings, surrounded by gardens of olives, figs and pomegranates.  In 1881 the PEF's Survey of Western Palestine (SWP) described it as a "Stone village, situated on very high ground, surrounded by figs and olives and arable land.	It contains about 200  Moslems, and has near it a fine group of springs."

A population list from about 1887 showed that  ’Ain Mahil had about  195 Muslim inhabitants.

British Mandate 
In the 1922 census of Palestine conducted  by the British Mandate authorities, 'Ain Mahel  had a population of 516, all Muslims.  The population   increased in the 1931 census of Palestine to 628, of whom 1 was Christian and the rest Muslims, in a total of 109 occupied houses.

In  the 1945 statistics the population was 1,040 Muslims, with 13,390  dunams of land, according to an official land and population survey. Of this, 1,486 dunams were for plantations and irrigable land,  6,748 for cereals, while 35 dunams were built-up land.

See also
Arab localities in Israel

References

Bibliography

 

 (p. 292)

External links
Welcome To 'Ayn Mahil
Survey of Western Palestine, Map 6:    IAA, Wikimedia commons

Arab localities in Israel
Local councils in Northern District (Israel)